Puuwai (literally, "heart" in Hawaiian) is an unincorporated community in Kauai County, Hawaii, United States, and the only settlement on the island of Niihau. It is at the western coast of the small island, and Native Hawaiians who live in this village speak the Niihau dialect of the Hawaiian language. The community lives as they did hundreds of years ago, and the modern amenities of life are extremely limited. Access to the town, as well as the whole island, is limited to Niihau residents; only official visitors and invited guests are permitted.  Puuwai has a one-room schoolhouse.

Puuwai is the westernmost community in the principal Hawaiian Islands.

References

Populated places on Niihau
Unincorporated communities in Kauai County, Hawaii
Unincorporated communities in Hawaii